The women's 100 metre backstroke S14 event at the 2016 Paralympic Games took place on 8 September, at the Olympic Aquatics Stadium. Two heats were held, the first with four swimmer and the second with five swimmers. The swimmers with the eight fastest times advanced to the final.

Records
, the existing World and Paralympic records were as follows.

Heats

Heat 1

Heat 2

Final

References

Swimming at the 2016 Summer Paralympics